"The Mystery of Sasassa Valley" is the first story by Arthur Conan Doyle to be published, in 1879. 

"The Mystery of Sasassa Valley" appeared anonymously in Chambers's Edinburgh Journal on 6 September 1879. The story is set in a valley in South Africa inhabited by a demon with glowing eyes.

References 

1879 short stories
Short stories by Arthur Conan Doyle
Works published anonymously
South Africa in fiction
Demons in written fiction